Yautepec may refer to:
San Bartolo Yautepec, town and municipality in Oaxaca
San Carlos Yautepec, town and municipality in Oaxaca
Yautepec District, district of Oaxaca
Yautepec de Zaragoza, town and municipality in Morelos

See also
Yautepec Zapotec (disambiguation)